Helluonidius is a genus of beetles in the family Carabidae, containing the following species:

 Helluonidius aterrimus (Macleay, 1873)
 Helluonidius chrysocomus Maindron, 1908
 Helluonidius cyaneus (Casetlnau, 1867)
 Helluonidius cyanipennis (Hope, 1842)
 Helluonidius laevifrons Darlington, 1968
 Helluonidius latipennis (Macleay, 1887)
 Helluonidius latipes Darlington, 1968
 Helluonidius politus Darlington, 1968

References

Anthiinae (beetle)
Carabidae genera